

The Indian judiciary has made judgments related to reservations, a system of affirmative action that provides for disadvantaged groups. These groups are primarily Scheduled Castes and Scheduled Tribes (SCs and STs), and from 1987 extended to Other Backward Classes (OBCs). Some of the court judgements have been modified by the Indian parliament.

Many of these cases are challenges under constitutional law and have led to constitutional amendments and challenges to the legality of such amendments. The frequency of decisions being overturned or invalidated reflect the ongoing efforts by lawmakers and the judiciary to strive towards equality.

Some major judgments are listed below.  Supreme Court cases are noted by the case citation "SC" or "SCC". All entries must be cited to reliable sources.

Footnotes

Notes

References

Further reading
 Articles 12, 14, 15, 16, 19, 335 of the Constitution of India
 State of Madras v. Smt. Champakam Dorairanjan AIR 1951 SC 226
 General Manager, S. Rly v. Rangachari AIR 1962 SC 36
 M R Balaji v. State of Mysore AIR 1963 SC 649
 T. Devadasan v. Union AIR 1964 SC 179.
 C. A. Rajendran v. Union of India AIR 1965 SC 507
 Chamaraja v. Mysore AIR 1967 Mys 21
 Barium Chemicals Ltd. v. Company Law Board AIR 1967 SC 295
 P. Rajendran v. State of Madras AIR 1968 SC 1012
 Triloki Nath v. The state of Jammu and Kashmir AIR 1969 SC 1
 State of Punjab v. Hira Lal 1970(3) SCC 567
 State of A.P. v. U.S.V. Balram AIR 1972 SC 1375
 Kesavananda Bharati v. State of Kerala AIR 1973 SC 1461
 State of Kerala v. N. M. Thomas AIR 1976 SC 490 : (1976) 2 SCC 310
 Jayasree v. State of Kerala AIR 1976 SC 2381
 Minerva Mills Ltd v. Union (1980) 3 SCC 625: AIR 1980 SC 1789
 Ajay Hasia v. Khalid Mujib  AIR 1981 SC 487
 Akhil Bharatiya Soshit Karamchari Sangh v. Union (1981) 1 SCC 246
 K. C. Vasant Kumar v. Karnataka AIR 1985 SC 1495
 Comptroller & Auditor-General of India, Gian Prakash v. K. S. Jaggannathan (1986) 2 SCC 679
 Syndicate Bank SC & ST Employees Association (Through its General Secretary Sh K S Badalia) & Others v. Union of India & Others {1990 SCR(3) 713; 1990 SCC Supl. 350}:
 Hindustan Zinc Ltd. v. A. P. State Electricity Board (1991) 3SCC 299
 Indra Sawhney & Others v. Union of India AIR 1993 SC 477: 1992 Supp (3) SCC 217
 Unni Krishnan v. State of A.P. and Others (1993 (1) SCC 645)
 R K Sabharwal v. State of Punjab AIR 1995 SC 1371 : (1995) 2 SCC 745
 Union of India v. Varpal Singh AIR 1996 SC 448
 Ajitsingh Januja & Others v. State of Punjab AIR 1996 SC 1189
 Ashok Kumar Gupta: Vidyasagar Gupta v. State of Uttar Pradesh 1997 (5) SCC 201
 Jagdish Lal and others v. State of Haryana and Others (1997) 6 SCC 538
 Chander Pal & Others v. State of Haryana (1997) 10 SCC 474
 Post-Graduate Institute of Medical Education and Research, Chandigarh v.  Faculty Association 1998 AIR(SC) 1767 : 1998 (4) SCC 1
 Ajitsingh Januja & Others v. State of Punjab & Others AIR 1999 SC 3471
 Indra Sawhney & Others v. Union of India AIR 2000 SC 498
 M G Badappanvar v. State of Karnataka 2001(2) SCC 666: AIR 2001 SC 260
 T.M.A. Pai Foundation v. State of Karnataka (2002) 8 SCC 481
 NTR University of Health Science Vijaywada v. G Babu Rajendra Prasad (2003) 5 SCC 350
 Islamic Academy of Education & Anr. v. State of Karnataka & Others (2003) 6 SCC 697
 Saurabh Chaudri & Others. v. Union of India & Others (2003) 11 SCC 146
 P.A. Inamdar v. State of Maharashtra 2005 AIR(SC) 3226
 I.R. Coelho (Dead) by LRS. v. State of  2007 (2) SCC 1: 2007 AIR(SC) 861
 M. Nagraj & Others v. Union of India and Others AIR 2007 SC 71
 Ashok Kumara Thakur v. Union of India 2008
 K. Manorama v. Union of India (2010) 10 SCC 323
 Suraj Bhan Meena v. State of Rajasthan (2011) 1 SCC 467

Reservation in India
India law-related lists